North Side (sometimes written as Northside) refers to the region of Pittsburgh, Pennsylvania, located to the north of the Allegheny River and the Ohio River.
The term "North Side" does not refer to a specific neighborhood, but rather to a disparate collection of contiguous neighborhoods.

The neighborhoods that make up the North Side of Pittsburgh include: Allegheny Center, Allegheny West, Brighton Heights, California-Kirkbride, Central Northside, Chateau, East Allegheny, Fineview, Manchester, Marshall-Shadeland, North Shore, Northview Heights, Perry North, Perry South, Spring Garden, Spring Hill–City View, Summer Hill, and Troy Hill.

The North Side has seven hills (Observatory, Monument, Troy, Spring, Seminary, Fineview, and Mt. Troy).

History and famous residents
In 1828, the borough of Allegheny, Pennsylvania, was incorporated where the North Side now stands.  It had a population of 1,000.  In 1880, Allegheny was incorporated as a city.  The City of Allegheny was annexed by Pittsburgh in 1907, and became known as the North Side.

Historians claim that the Felix Brunot mansion on Stockton Avenue (Allegheny Center) was once a station on the Underground Railroad, where fugitive slaves from the South stopped for food and shelter. The Allegheny regional branch of the Carnegie Library of Pittsburgh, located at 5 Allegheny Square (Allegheny Center), was the first tax-supported library in the United States. It is now closed to the public following a lightning strike on April 6, 2007. A new library opened nearby at 1230 Federal Street. Charles Taze Russell organized what are now known as Jehovah's Witnesses at a house in the old city of Allegheny.

Mary Cassatt was born on Rebecca Street in 1844. Today, Rebecca Street has become Reedsdale Street (in the North Shore neighborhood). If the house had not been torn down for Highway Route 65, it would be facing Heinz Field, the home of the Pittsburgh Steelers.

George Washington Gale Ferris Jr. lived at 1318 Arch Street (Central Northside) when he created the original Ferris Wheel for the 1893 Chicago World's Columbian Exposition in an attempt to create something as impressive as the Eiffel Tower in Paris, France.

The first World Series was played at Exposition Park by the Pittsburgh Pirates and the Boston Americans (now known as the Boston Red Sox) in 1903.

Gus & Yia-Yia's Iceball Stand, selling fresh popcorn, peanuts, and old-fashioned iceballs (similar to snow cones) hand-scraped from a block of ice, has been in West Park since 1934.  The "orange concession stand with a brightly colored umbrella" is something of an unofficial Pittsburgh landmark during the summer months.

A 20-acre Allis-Chalmers transformer factory provided as many as 2,600 jobs to the area from 1897 until closing in the Summer of 1975.

Places of interest

16th Street Bridge
Allegheny Observatory
Allegheny West historic district
Andy Warhol Museum
Carnegie Science Center
Children's Museum of Pittsburgh
Community College of Allegheny County
Deutschtown historic district
Heinz Field
Manchester historic district
Mattress Factory
Mexican War Streets historic district located in Central North Side
National Aviary
PNC Park
Randyland
Riverview Park
West Park

See also
 List of Pittsburgh neighborhoods

References

External links

City of Pittsburgh's Central Northside page
Feature in the Charleston Gazette
Northside Leadership Conference

Neighborhoods in Pittsburgh